Alleged Violations of the 1955 Treaty of Amity, Economic Relations, and Consular Rights (Islamic Republic of Iran v. United States of America) is the formal name of a case in the International Court of Justice (ICJ). Iran filed a lawsuit with the Hague-based ICJ against the United States, on 16 July 2018, mainly based on the 1955 Treaty of Amity signed between the two sides on 15 August 1955 and entered into force in 1957, well before the Islamic revolution of Iran. Iranian officials alleged that U.S. re-imposition of the nuclear sanctions was a violation of the treaty. Iran also filed a request for provisional measures.  In response, the United States asserted that the lawsuit as "baseless" and vowed to oppose it.  Almost a month later, the ICJ heard the provisional measures request.  On 3 October 2018, the International Court of Justice issued a provisional measures order requiring the United States "to lift sanctions linked to humanitarian goods and civil aviation imposed against Iran."  

On 23 August 2019, the United States raised preliminary objections to the jurisdiction of the Court and the admissibility of the Application. In accordance with the Rules of Court, the proceedings on the merits of the case were then suspended.

On 3 February 2021, the ICJ delivered its Judgment on the preliminary objections raised by the United States of America, rejecting the arguments and finding that it had jurisdiction to entertain the case.  The case will now proceed to the merits, with the United States scheduled to file its Counter-Memorial by 20 September 2021.

Background

Long before Iran's Islamic Revolution in 1979, Iran and the United States signed the Treaty of Amity which was meant to provide "a basis for friendly diplomatic exchanges and economic relations." 

In 2018, U.S. President Donald Trump withdrew from the Joint Comprehensive Plan of Action (JCPOA) between the United States, European Union, Russia, China, and Iran to address Iran's nuclear programs.  Under the JCPOA, some of the sanctions against Iran were lifted in exchange for Tehran accepting some limitations on its nuclear program. Following withdrawal from the JCPOA, the United States announced "unilateral plans" to re-impose sanctions against Iran. The Iranian government believed that the United States’ decision on 8 May 2018, to re-impose nuclear sanctions on Iran was a violation of the United States' international obligations, "especially articles 4, 7, 8, 9, 10" of the JCPOA and the Treaty of Amity. Consequently, Iran filed a lawsuit with the International Court of Justice on 16 July 2018.   In response, the U.S. government announced its withdrawal from the Treaty of Amity with Iran, which requires "giving one year's written notice" according to the treaty itself. The act was criticized by Mohammad Javad Zarif.

2018 Provisional Measures Order
On 3 October 2018, the ICJ issued a provisional measures order, requiring the United States to lift certain restrictions to ensure access to "humanitarian trade, food, medicine and civil aviation." "On humanitarian grounds, the US must remove by means of its choosing any impediment to the free exportation to Iran of goods involving humanitarian concerns," said the United Nations court's verdict on 3 October 2018. Mohammad Javad Zarif, the Iranian Foreign Minister, hailed the ruling and described it as "a victory for the rule of law."

References

International Court of Justice cases
Iran–United States relations
2018 in Iran
2018 in American politics
2018 in international relations